Érica García (born 6 April 1968) is an Argentinian composer, singer and an actress. She was nominated only once in the Latin Grammy Awards of 2000 for Best Female Rock Vocal Performance for her popular tune "Vete Destino" but did not win. While best known as a rock singer, she also sings tango music and jazz. She has worked as a writer, painter, fashion designer and television personality among other creative endeavours. Part of her ancestry can be traced to the Guaraní people.

Musical career
García began her solo career in 1996 after 3 years of playing in Mata Violeta, the punk rock band she created in 1991. She made three records for Universal Music Group, the first one was produced by Ricardo Mollo (her partner in the years 1989-1999), the second one (nominated for the Latin Grammy) was produced by Garcia herself and Ricardo Mollo and the third record Amorama, was produced by Gustavo Santaolalla. Rolling Stone Argentina would describe Amorama as "the most important 2001 Argentine launch of the multinational Universal [Music Group]" that following year. García would tour with Enrique Bunbury who would declare that her voice is "born for rock." In 2003, she would perform in the Latin Alternative Music Conference. Of her participation there The New York Times would state, "that night's most impressive showing came in the PJ Harvey-like confidence of the Argentine singer Erica García, one of the few women who plays guitar and writes her own songs to reach international fame in this male-dominated genre."

García played and recorded in the Los Angeles musical collective Fool's Gold. She recorded and produced her fourth album ¨Afternoon in Bamboos¨ in Silver Lake, Los Angeles, 2006. She created the band Mountain Party to play the Hypnorituals and Mesmemusical miracles Hanging in the sky, an iconic folk festival curated by Devendra Banhart. García would also study acting at the Stella Adler Studio of Acting under Norman Brisky. She returned to her country Argentina in 2010. She organized the Santo Bombo parties, with bombo legüero performances, dancers, tattoo artists, and electronic music.
She played the Hot Festival in October 2010, with Massive Attack, Scissors Sisters, Yeasayer and Mika among other artists.
García currently lives in Buenos Aires, and she plays shows all over the country. She directs Escuela de Experimentacion Vocal. In 2014 she released an album of tangos titled Tangos Vampiros.

Collaborations
Garcia collaborated with the band Divididos, on ukulele and accordion in "El Burrito" and "Sisters", she served as the guest musician (1992 to 1998) with Brazzaville in two albums. She performed with Café Tacuba, Ely Guerra, Los Tres and Javiera Parra at the MTV Latin awards in Los Angeles, 2002.
Her other collaboration include Brazzaville, Cienfuegos Hecuba Montecarlo Jazz Ensemble Pampa del Indio Andrea Alvarez Fool's Gold

Discography

Solo
El cerebro (1997) Producer : Ricardo Mollo 
Musicians:  
Erica Garcia 
Martin Aloe 
Alejo Vintrob 
Max Araujo 
Ervin Stutz 
Fabian Von Quntiero 
La bestia (1998) Producer: Erica Garcia and Ricardo Mollo
Musicians:  
Erica Garcia 
Martin Aloe 
Fernando Samalea 
Ricardo Mollo 
Ervin Stutz 
Matias Zapata 
Amorama (2001) Producer: Gustavo Santaolalla

Musicians:  
Justin Meldhal Johnsen 
Jon Brion 
Victor Indrizzo 
Roger Manning Jr.  
Joe Gore 
David Campbell 
Sebastian Escofet 
Javier Casalla 
Gustavo Santaolalla

Tangos Vampiros (2014)

As Mountain Party
Afternoon in Bamboos (2006)

As Lady Grave
Lady Grave (2006)

Compilations
"New Weird American "2007
"Surco Artists "2000

Tributes
"Through the Wilderness" Madonna Tribute  (Manimal Vinyl) 2006 
"Tributo a Sandro", "Quiero llenarme de ti" 2000

Awards
Latin Grammy Nomination, 2000
Premio Gardel 1999 Nominacion, Mejor Artista de rock
Premio Gardel 2002 Nominacion 
MTV Latin awards nominee
Best female singer, Rolling Stone Latin America 2000, 2001, 2002
Best New Artist, 2000, awarded by Diario Clarin
One of the 20 women of the year, 2000, awarded by Diario Clarin

Film and TV career
"The Treasure of the Black Jaguar" (2010) directed by Mike Bruce: as "Carmelita"."Franco Buenaventura" (2002) as "Gisela".

References

External links
Official Website
Official Twitter
MSN Music
IMDb Credits
Allbusiness.com
Diario Clarin
Nominated Premio Gardel

1968 births
Alternative rock guitarists
Alternative rock singers
Argentine women singer-songwriters
20th-century Argentine women singers
Argentine rock singers
Argentine people of Guaraní descent
Women rock singers
Indie rock musicians
Living people
Musicians from Buenos Aires
Rock en Español musicians
Singers from Buenos Aires
Tango musicians
21st-century guitarists
21st-century Argentine women singers
Women in Latin music
21st-century women guitarists